Polynoncus pilularis is a species of hide beetle in the subfamily Omorginae found in Argentina, Chile, Uruguay, Paraguay, and Brazil.

References

pilularius
Beetles described in 1824
Beetles of South America